Bryan Vázquez (born August 26, 1987) is a Costa Rican professional boxer.

Professional career

On November 3, 2011, Vázquez defeated Santos Benavides by twelfth round unanimous decision for the interim WBA Super featherweight title. On July 21, 2012 Vázquez defeated Jorge Lacierva to earn a match against WBA World super featherweight champion, Takashi Uchiyama. This was also a match up between two boxers in The Ring Magazine's top ten Junior Lightweights, with Vázquez having recently moved into the tenth spot and Uchiyama residing in the number one spot. The match took place on New Year's Eve, 2012 in Tokyo, Japan. Vázquez was defeated by TKO when Uchiyama landed several punches to the head and the referee stopped the fight after the bell ending the eighth round.

Professional boxing record

See also
List of super-featherweight boxing champions

References

External links

1987 births
Living people
Costa Rican male boxers
Super-featherweight boxers
Lightweight boxers
World super-featherweight boxing champions
World Boxing Association champions